The Anthology is the only compilation album by American glam metal band Autograph. Released as a two-disc set in 2011, it is a digital remaster of two Autograph albums, Missing Pieces and Buzz. The first disc is a remaster of Missing Pieces, reissued as "Studio Demos 1983-1988", and contains additional tracks from the 2003 album More Missing Pieces. The second disc is the digital remaster of Buzz, reissued as Buzz and Beyond with two additional versions of "Turn Up the Radio", an alternate electric version which was first featured on Steve Plunkett's My Attitude album and an acoustic version listed as "unplugged".

Track listing

References

Autograph (American band) albums
2011 compilation albums